Eugène Alphonse Dyer (December 12, 1838 – December 2, 1911) was a merchant, farmer and political figure in Quebec. He represented Brome in the House of Commons of Canada from 1891 to 1896 as a Conservative member.

He was born in Sutton, Lower Canada, the son of George C. Dyer. Dyer served on the council for Sutton and was mayor and county warden. He also served as secretary-treasurer for the township school commission. His election in 1891 was overturned after an appeal but Dyer won the by-election that followed in 1892. He was married twice: to Harriet Jackson in 1860 and then to Adaline J. Carpenter in 1869.

By-election: On Mr. Dyer being unseated

References 
 
The Canadian parliamentary companion, 1891, AJ Gemmill

1838 births
1911 deaths
Members of the House of Commons of Canada from Quebec
Conservative Party of Canada (1867–1942) MPs
Mayors of places in Quebec
People from Sutton, Quebec